Jelena Škerović (born 23 December 1980) is a Montenegrin female basketball coach and former player. Currently she is head coach of Lotos Gdynia and the Montenegrin national team.

References

External links
Profile at FIBA Europe
Profile at eurobasket.com

1980 births
Living people
Point guards
Montenegrin women's basketball players
Montenegrin women's basketball coaches
Sportspeople from Podgorica
Montenegrin expatriate basketball people in the Czech Republic
Montenegrin expatriate basketball people in Poland
Montenegrin expatriate basketball people in Russia
Montenegrin expatriate basketball people in Turkey